The QLG-10  and QLG-10A are a family of Chinese 35 mm under-barrel grenade launchers designed for QBZ-95 and QBZ-95-1 of assault rifles. The launcher fires 35mm caseless grenades, designated DFS-10.

Design and development
QLG-10 is a single shot, manual, front loading grenade launcher. Grenade launcher is pre-engraved with rifling to provide in-flight stabilization with rotation. Standard projectile weights 169 gram with muzzle velocity of 78 meters per second.

Type 10 projectile is caseless and low velocity, designed for shoulder fire and handheld operations. Type 10 grenade utilizes high-low cartridge designed for low recoil operation with extended range. The grenade has an effective range of 400 meters.

An iron sight is provided with seven adjustable range marks. The YMAL10-35 red dot sight can be attached to the left side of the grenade launcher, providing range-finding function.

Grenade Types
Four types of grenade are available: 
 DFS-10 High Explosive Fragmentation Grenade: effective against infantry personal inside  range. 
 DFS-10A Bouncing Air-burst Fragmentation Grenade:  range. It's equipped with pre-set airburst munition and jump-up detonation fuse, similar to US M397A1 40mm cartridge.
 DFJ-10 High Explosive Dual Purpose Grenade: effective against infantry personal inside  range, as well as against light vehicles in  range.
 DFX-10 Trajectory Marker Grenade:  range, and can be used for trajectory adjustment for other grenade type.
 DFD-10: Smoke grenade with  range, with colored smoke available.

Variants
QLG-10 Original variant designed for QBZ-95 and can be attached to QBZ-95-1. 
QLG-10A Redesigned new variant that can be attached to QBZ-95-1, QBZ-95B-1, and compatible to the QBZ-95. The new variant has a redesigned trigger mechanism.

Users
: People's Liberation Army

See also
Type 91 grenade launcher

International:
M203
M320
GP-34

References

Grenade launchers of the People's Republic of China
Weapons of the People's Republic of China
Grenade launchers